GBZ may
refer to:
 Criggion Radio Station, a defunct British VLF transmitter
 Centre for British Studies, Humboldt University of Berlin
 Great Barrier Aerodrome, on Great Barrier Island, New Zealand
 Guanabenz, an antihypertensive drug
  The international vehicle registration code for Gibraltar
 Zoroastrian Dari language